A precedent is a principle or rule established in a previous legal case relevant to a court or other tribunal when deciding subsequent cases with similar issues or facts. Common-law legal systems often view precedent as binding or persuasive, while civil law systems do not. Common-law systems aim for similar facts to yield similar and predictable outcomes, and observing precedent when making decisions is the mechanism to achieve that goal. Common-law precedent is a third kind of law, on equal footing with statutory law (that is, statutes and codes enacted by legislative bodies) and subordinate legislation (that is, regulations promulgated by executive branch agencies, in the form of delegated legislation) in UK parlance – or regulatory law (in US parlance). The principle by which judges are bound to precedents is known as stare decisis (a Latin phrase with the literal meaning of "to stand in the-things-that-have-been-decided").

Case law, in common-law jurisdictions, is the set of decisions of adjudicatory tribunals or other rulings that can be cited as precedent. In most countries, including most European countries, the term is applied to any set of rulings on law, which is guided by previous rulings, for example, previous decisions of a government agency. Essential to the development of case law is the publication and indexing of decisions for use by lawyers, courts, and the general public, in the form of law reports. A precedent is a historical setting example for the future (though at varying levels of authority as discussed throughout this article), some become "leading cases" or "landmark decisions" that are cited especially often.

Generally speaking, a legal precedent is said to be:

 applied (if precedent is binding) / adopted (if precedent is persuasive), if the principles underpinning the previous decision are accordingly used to evaluate the issues of the subsequent case; 
 distinguished, if the principles underpinning the previous decision are found specific to, or premised upon, certain factual scenarios, and not applied to the subsequent case because of the absence or material difference in the latter's facts; 
 modified, if the same court on determination of the same case on order from a higher court modified one or more parts of the previous decision; or
 overruled, if the same or higher courts on appeal or determination of subsequent cases found the principles underpinning the previous decision erroneous in law or overtaken by new legislation or developments.

In contrast, civil law systems adhere to a legal positivism, where past decisions do not usually have the precedential, binding effect that they have in common law decision-making; the judicial review practiced by constitutional courts can be regarded as a notable exception.

Principle
Stare decisis is a legal principle by which judges are obligated to respect the precedent established by prior decisions. The words originate from the phrasing of the principle in the Latin maxim Stare decisis et non quieta movere: "to stand by decisions and not disturb the undisturbed". In a legal context, this means that courts should abide by precedent and not disturb settled matters. The principle can be divided into two components:

 A decision made by a superior court, or by the same court in an earlier decision, is binding precedent that the court itself and all its inferior courts must follow.
 A court may overturn its own precedent, but should do so only if a strong reason exists to do so, and even in that case, should be guided by principles from superior, lateral, and inferior courts.

The second principle, regarding persuasive precedent, reflects the broad precedent guidance a court may draw upon in reaching all of its decisions.

Case law in common-law systems
In the common-law tradition, courts decide the law applicable to a case by interpreting statutes and applying precedent, which record how and why prior cases have been decided. Unlike most civil-law systems, common-law systems follow the doctrine of stare decisis, by which most courts are bound by their own previous decisions in similar cases, and all lower courts should make decisions consistent with previous decisions of higher courts. For example, in England and Wales, the High Court and the Court of Appeal are each bound by their own previous decisions, but the Supreme Court of the United Kingdom is able to deviate from its earlier decisions, although in practice it rarely does so.

Generally speaking, higher courts do not have direct oversight over day-to-day proceedings in lower courts, in that they cannot reach out on their own initiative (sua sponte) at any time to reverse or overrule decisions of the lower courts. Normally, the burden rests with litigants to appeal rulings (including those in clear violation of established case law) to the higher courts. If a judge acts against precedent and the case is not appealed, the decision will stand.

A lower court may not rule against a binding precedent, even if the lower court feels that the precedent is unjust; the lower court may only express the hope that a higher court or the legislature will reform the rule in question. If the court believes that developments or trends in legal reasoning render the precedent unhelpful, and wishes to evade it and help the law evolve, the court may either hold that the precedent is inconsistent with subsequent authority, or that the precedent should be "distinguished" by some material difference between the facts of the cases.  If that decision goes to appeal, the appellate court will have the opportunity to review both the precedent and the case under appeal, perhaps overruling the previous case law by setting a new precedent of higher authority. This may happen several times as the case works its way through successive appeals. Lord Denning, first of the High Court of Justice, later of the Court of Appeal, provided a famous example of this evolutionary process in his development of the concept of estoppel starting in the High Trees case: Central London Property Trust Ltd v. High Trees House Ltd [1947] K.B. 130.

Judges may refer to various types of persuasive authority to reach a decision in a case. Widely cited nonbinding sources include legal encyclopedias such as Corpus Juris Secundum and Halsbury's Laws of England, or the published work of the Law Commission or the American Law Institute. Some bodies are given statutory powers to issue guidance with persuasive authority or similar statutory effect, such as the Highway Code.

In federal or multijurisdictional law systems,  conflicts may exist between the various lower appellate courts. Sometimes these differences may not be resolved and  distinguishing how the law is applied in one district, province, division or appellate department may be necessary. Usually, only an appeal accepted by the court of last resort will resolve such differences, and for many reasons, such appeals are often not granted.

Any court may seek to distinguish its present case from that of a binding precedent, to reach a different conclusion. The validity of such a distinction may or may not be accepted on appeal. An appellate court may also propound an entirely new and different analysis from that of junior courts, and may or may not be bound by its own previous decisions, or in any case may distinguish the decisions based on significant differences in the facts applicable to each case. Or, a court may view the matter before it as one of "first impression", not governed by any controlling precedent.

When various members of a multi-judge court write separate opinions, the reasoning may differ; only the ratio decidendi of the majority becomes binding precedent. For example, if a 12-member court splits 5–2–3–2 in four different opinions on several different issues, whatever reasoning commands seven votes on each specific issue becomes precedent, and the seven-judge majorities may differ issue-to-issue. All may be cited as persuasive (though of course opinions that concur in the majority result are more persuasive than dissents).

Quite apart from the rules of precedent, the weight actually given to any reported opinion may depend on the reputation of both the court and the judges with respect to the specific issue. For example, in the United States, the Second Circuit (New York and surrounding states) is especially respected in commercial and securities law, the Seventh Circuit (in Chicago), especially Judge Posner, is highly regarded on antitrust, and the District of Columbia Circuit is highly regarded on administrative law.

Categories and classifications of precedent, and effect of classification

Verticality
Generally, a common law court system has trial courts, intermediate appellate courts and a supreme court. The inferior courts conduct almost all trial proceedings. The inferior courts are bound to obey precedent established by the appellate court for their jurisdiction, and all supreme court precedent.

The Supreme Court of California's explanation of this principle is that

An Intermediate state appellate court is generally bound to follow the decisions of the highest court of that state.

The application of the doctrine of stare decisis from a higher court or a court superior to those courts inferior to it or lower in the tribunal hierarchy is sometimes called vertical stare decisis.

Horizontality
The idea that a judge is bound by (or at least should respect) decisions of earlier judges of similar or coordinate level is called horizontal stare decisis.

In the United States federal court system, the intermediate appellate courts are divided into thirteen "circuits", each covering some range of territory ranging in size from the District of Columbia alone, and up to seven states. Each panel of judges on the court of appeals for a circuit is bound to obey the prior appellate decisions of the same circuit. Precedent of a United States court of appeals may be overruled only by the court en banc, that is, a session of all the active appellate judges of the circuit, or by the United States Supreme Court, not simply by a different three-judge panel.

When a court binds itself, this application of the doctrine of precedent is sometimes called horizontal stare decisis. The state of New York has a similar appellate structure as it is divided into four appellate departments supervised by the final New York Court of Appeals. Decisions of one appellate department are not binding upon another, and in some cases the departments differ considerably on interpretations of law.

Federalism and parallel state and federal courts
In federal systems the division between federal and state law may result in complex interactions. In the United States, state courts are not considered inferior to federal courts but rather constitute a parallel court system.

  When a federal court rules on an issue of state law, the federal court must follow the precedent of the state courts, under the Erie doctrine. If an issue of state law arises during a case in federal court, and there is no decision on point from the highest court of the state, the federal court must either attempt to predict how the state courts would resolve the issue by looking at decisions from state appellate courts, or, if allowed by the constitution of the relevant state, submit the question to the state's courts.
 On the other hand, when a state court rules on an issue of federal law, the state court is bound only by rulings of the Supreme Court, but not by decisions of federal district or circuit courts of appeals. However some states have adopted a practice of considering themselves bound by rulings of the court of appeals embracing their states, as a matter of comity rather than constitutional obligation.

In practice, however, judges in one system will almost always choose to follow relevant case law in the other system to prevent divergent results and to minimize forum shopping.

Binding precedent

Precedent that must be applied or followed is known as binding precedent (alternately metaphorically precedent, mandatory or binding authority, etc.). Under the doctrine of stare decisis, a lower court must honor findings of law made by a higher court that is within the appeals path of cases the court hears. In state and federal courts in the United States of America, jurisdiction is often divided geographically among local trial courts, several of which fall under the territory of a regional appeals court. All appellate courts fall under a highest court (sometimes but not always called a "supreme court"). By definition, decisions of lower courts are not binding on courts higher in the system, nor are appeals court decisions binding on local courts that fall under a different appeals court. Further, courts must follow their own proclamations of law made earlier on other cases, and honor rulings made by other courts in disputes among the parties before them pertaining to the same pattern of facts or events, unless they have a strong reason to change these rulings.

In law, a binding precedent (also known as a mandatory precedent or binding authority) is a precedent which must be followed by all lower courts under common law legal systems. In English law it is usually created by the decision of a higher court, such as the Supreme Court of the United Kingdom, which took over the judicial functions of the House of Lords in 2009. In civil law and pluralist systems, precedent is not binding but case law is taken into account by the courts.

Binding precedent relies on the legal principle of stare decisis. Stare decisis means to stand by things decided. It ensures certainty and consistency in the application of law. Existing binding precedent from past cases are applied in principle to new situations by analogy.

One law professor has described mandatory precedent as follows:

In extraordinary circumstances a higher court may overturn or overrule mandatory precedent, but will often attempt to distinguish the precedent before overturning it, thereby limiting the scope of the precedent.

Under the U.S. legal system, courts are set up in a hierarchy. At the top of the federal or national system is the Supreme Court, and underneath are lower federal courts. The state court systems have hierarchy structures similar to that of the federal system.

The U.S. Supreme Court has final authority on questions about the meaning of federal law, including the U.S. Constitution. For example, when the Supreme Court says that the First Amendment applies in a specific way to suits for slander, then every court is bound by that precedent in its interpretation of the First Amendment as it applies to suits for slander. If a lower court judge disagrees with a higher court precedent on what the First Amendment should mean, the lower court judge must rule according to the binding precedent. Until the higher court changes the ruling (or the law itself is changed), the binding precedent is authoritative on the meaning of the law.

Lower courts are bound by the precedent set by higher courts within their region. Thus, a federal district court that falls within the geographic boundaries of the Third Circuit Court of Appeals (the mid-level appeals court that hears appeals from district court decisions from Delaware, New Jersey, Pennsylvania, and the Virgin Islands) is bound by rulings of the Third Circuit Court, but not by rulings in the Ninth Circuit (Alaska, Arizona, California, Guam, Hawaii, Idaho, Montana, Nevada, Northern Mariana Islands, Oregon, and Washington), since the Circuit Courts of Appeals have jurisdiction defined by geography. The Circuit Courts of Appeals can interpret the law how they want, so long as there is no binding Supreme Court precedent. One of the common reasons the Supreme Court grants certiorari (that is, they agree to hear a case) is if there is a conflict among the circuit courts as to the meaning of a federal law.

There are three elements needed for a precedent to work. Firstly, the hierarchy of the courts needs to be accepted, and an efficient system of law reporting. "A balance must be struck between the need on one side for the legal certainty resulting from the binding effect of previous decisions, and on the other side the avoidance of undue restriction on the proper development of the law."

Binding precedent in English law
Judges are bound by the law of binding precedent in England and Wales and other common law jurisdictions. This is a distinctive feature of the English legal system. In Scotland and many countries throughout the world, particularly in mainland Europe, civil law means that judges take case law into account in a similar way, but are not obliged to do so and are required to consider the precedent in terms of principle. Their fellow judges' decisions may be persuasive but are not binding. Under the English legal system, judges are not necessarily entitled to make their own decisions about the development or interpretations of the law. They may be bound by a decision reached in a previous case. Two facts are crucial to determining whether a precedent is binding:
 The position in the court hierarchy of the court which decided the precedent, relative to the position in the court trying the current case.
 Whether the facts of the current case come within the scope of the principle of law in previous decisions.

In a conflict of laws situation, jus cogens norms erga omnes and principles of the common law such as in the Universal Declaration of Human Rights, to a varying degree in different jurisdictions, are deemed overriding which means they are used to "read down" legislation, that is giving them a particular purposive interpretation, for example applying European Court of Human Rights jurisprudence of courts (case law).

"Super stare decisis"

"Super stare decisis" is a term used for important precedent that is resistant or immune from being overturned, without regard to whether correctly decided in the first place. It may be viewed as one extreme in a range of precedential power, or alternatively, to express a belief, or a critique of that belief, that some decisions should not be overturned.

In 1976, Richard Posner and William Landes coined the term "super-precedent" in an article they wrote about testing theories of precedent by counting citations. Posner and Landes used this term to describe the influential effect of a cited decision. The term "super-precedent" later became associated with different issue: the difficulty of overturning a decision. In 1992, Rutgers professor Earl Maltz criticized the Supreme Court's decision in Planned Parenthood v. Casey for endorsing the idea that if one side can take control of the Court on an issue of major national importance (as in Roe v. Wade), that side can protect its position from being reversed "by a kind of super-stare decisis". The controversial idea that some decisions are virtually immune from being overturned, regardless of whether they were decided correctly in the first place, is the idea to which the term "super-stare decisis" now usually refers.

The concept of super-stare decisis (or "super-precedent") was mentioned during the hearings of Chief Justice John Roberts and Justice Samuel Alito before the Senate Judiciary Committee. Prior to the commencement of the Roberts hearings, the committee chair, Senator Arlen Specter of Pennsylvania, wrote an op-ed in The New York Times referring to Roe as a "super-precedent". He revisited this concept during the hearings, but neither Roberts nor Alito endorsed the term or the concept.

Persuasive precedent

Persuasive precedent (also persuasive authority) is precedent or other legal writing that is not binding precedent but that is useful or relevant and that may guide the judge in making the decision in a current case. Persuasive precedent includes cases decided by lower courts, by peer or higher courts from other geographic jurisdictions, cases made in other parallel systems (for example, military courts, administrative courts, indigenous/tribal courts, state courts versus federal courts in the United States), statements made in dicta, treatises or academic law reviews, and in some exceptional circumstances, cases of other nations, treaties, world judicial bodies, etc.

In a "case of first impression", courts often rely on persuasive precedent from courts in other jurisdictions that have previously dealt with similar issues. Persuasive precedent may become binding through its adoption by a higher court.

In civil law and pluralist systems, as under Scots law, precedent is not binding but case law is taken into account by the courts.

Higher courts in other circuits
A court may consider the ruling of a higher court that is not binding. For example, a district court in the United States First Circuit could consider a ruling made by the United States Court of Appeals for the Ninth Circuit as persuasive authority.

Horizontal courts
Courts may consider rulings made in other courts that are of equivalent authority in the legal system. For example, an appellate court for one district could consider a ruling issued by an appeals court in another district.

Statements made in obiter dicta

Courts may consider obiter dicta in opinions of higher courts. Dicta of a higher court, though not binding, will often be persuasive to lower courts.  The phrase obiter dicta is usually translated as "other things said", but due to the high number of judges and individual concurring opinions, it is often hard to distinguish from the ratio decidendi (reason for the decision).  For these reasons, the obiter dicta may often be taken into consideration by a court.  A litigant may also consider obiter dicta if a court has previously signaled that a particular legal argument is weak and may even warrant sanctions if repeated.

Dissenting opinions
A case decided by a multijudge panel could result in a split decision. While only the majority opinion is considered precedential, an outvoted judge can still publish a dissenting opinion.  Common patterns for dissenting opinions include:
 an explanation of how the outcome of the case might be different on slightly different facts, in an attempt to limit the holding of the majority
 planting seeds for a future overruling of the majority opinion
A judge in a subsequent case, particularly in a different jurisdiction, could find the dissenting judge's reasoning persuasive. In the jurisdiction of the original decision, however, a judge should only overturn the holding of a court lower or equivalent in the hierarchy. A district court, for example, could not rely on a Supreme Court dissent as a basis to depart from the reasoning of the majority opinion.  However, lower courts occasionally cite dissents, either for a limiting principle on the majority, or for propositions that are not stated in the majority opinion and not inconsistent with that majority, or to explain a disagreement with the majority and to urge reform (while following the majority in the outcome).

Secondary sources

Treatises, restatements of the law, and law reviews. 
Courts may consider the writings of eminent legal scholars in treatises, restatements of the law, and law reviews. The extent to which judges find these types of writings persuasive will vary widely with elements such as the reputation of the author and the relevance of the argument.

State attorney general opinions 
In the United States, every state attorney general is permitted to issue advisory opinions on questions of law. It is a process that has its origins in the English common law. Most state attorney opinions address issues of government finance or the authority of political bodies within the state. Often, these opinions are the only available authority interpreting rarely‑litigated statutes and constitutional provisions. 

By and large, courts treat state attorney general opinions as persuasive authority. The opinions lack the force of law that statutes and judicial opinions have. But, they still have the potential to act as a sort of pseudo‑law if they constrain the activities of public officials or the public. Often times, this effect depends on the “formality” of the opinion. Opinions can be either formal, meaning they are published, or informal, meaning that they are sent directly to the opinion requestor. Although formal opinions can act as a sort of binding precedent when they answer legal questions that a court has not, either form of opinion may act as a source of law if they have a direct effect on the administration of government.

Persuasive effect of decisions from other jurisdictions
The courts of England and Wales are free to consider decisions of other jurisdictions, and give them whatever persuasive weight the English court sees fit, even though these other decisions are not binding precedent.  Jurisdictions that are closer to modern English common law are more likely to be given persuasive weight (for example Commonwealth states such as Canada, Australia, or New Zealand).  Persuasive weight might be given to other common law courts, such as from the United States, most often where the American courts have been particularly innovative, e.g. in product liability and certain areas of contract law.

In the United States, in the late 20th and early 21st centuries, the concept of a U.S. court considering foreign law or precedent has been considered controversial by some parties. The Supreme Court splits on this issue. This critique is recent, as in the early history of the United States, citation of English authority was ubiquitous. One of the first acts of many of the new state legislatures was to adopt the body of English common law into the law of the state.  Citation to English cases was common through the 19th and well into the 20th centuries.  Even in the late 20th and early 21st centuries, it is relatively uncontroversial for American state courts to rely on English decisions for matters of pure common (i.e. judge-made) law.

Within the federal legal systems of several common-law countries, and most especially the United States, it is relatively common for the distinct lower-level judicial systems (e.g. state courts in the United States and Australia, provincial courts in Canada) to regard the decisions of other jurisdictions within the same country as persuasive precedent. Particularly in the United States, the adoption of a legal doctrine by a large number of other state judiciaries is regarded as highly persuasive evidence that such doctrine is preferred. A good example is the adoption in Tennessee of comparative negligence (replacing contributory negligence as a complete bar to recovery) by the 1992 Tennessee Supreme Court decision McIntyre v. Balentine (by this point all US jurisdictions save Tennessee, five other states, and the District of Columbia had adopted comparative negligence schemes). Moreover, in American law, the Erie doctrine requires federal courts sitting in diversity actions to apply state substantive law, but in a manner consistent with how the court believes the state's highest court would rule in that case. Since such decisions are not binding on state courts, but are often very well-reasoned and useful, state courts cite federal interpretations of state law fairly often as persuasive precedent, although it is also fairly common for a state high court to reject a federal court's interpretation of its jurisprudence.

Nonprecedential decisions: unpublished decisions, non-publication and depublication, noncitation rules

Nonpublication of opinions, or unpublished opinions, are those decisions of courts that are not available for citation as precedent because the judges making the opinion deem the cases as having less precedential value. Selective publication is the legal process which a judge or justices of a court decide whether a decision is to be or not published in a reporter. "Unpublished" federal appellate decisions are published in the Federal Appendix. Depublication is the power of a court to make a previously published order or opinion unpublished.

Litigation that is settled out of court generates no written decision, thus has no precedential effect.  As one practical effect, the U.S. Department of Justice settles many cases against the federal government simply to avoid creating adverse precedent.

Res judicata, claim preclusion, collateral estoppel, issue preclusion, law of the case
Several rules may cause a decision to apply as narrow "precedent" to preclude future legal positions of the specific parties to a case, even if a decision is non-precedential with respect to all other parties.

Res judicata, claim preclusion

Once a case is decided, the same plaintiff cannot sue the same defendant again on any claim arising out of the same facts.  The law requires plaintiffs to put all issues on the table in a single case, not split the case.  For example, in a case of an auto accident, the plaintiff cannot sue first for property damage, and then personal injury in a separate case.  This is called res judicata or claim preclusion ("Res judicata" is the traditional name going back centuries; the name shifted to "claim preclusion" in the United States over the late 20th century).  Claim preclusion applies regardless of the plaintiff wins or loses the earlier case, even if the later case raises a different legal theory, even the second claim is unknown at the time of the first case.  Exceptions are extremely limited, for example if the two claims for relief must necessarily be brought in different courts (for example, one claim might be exclusively federal, and the other exclusively state).

Collateral estoppel, issue preclusion

Once a case is finally decided, any issues decided in the previous case may be binding against the party who lost the issue in later cases, even in cases involving other parties.  For example, if a first case decides that a party was negligent, then other plaintiffs may rely on that earlier determination in later cases, and need not reprove the issue of negligence.  For another example, if a patent is shown to be invalid in a case against one accused infringer, that same patent is invalid against all other accused infringers—invalidity need not be reproven.  Again,  limits and exceptions on this principle exist.  The principle is called collateral estoppel or issue preclusion.

Law of the case

Within a single case, once there has been a first appeal, both the lower court and the appellate court itself will not further review the same issue, and will not re-review an issue that could have been appealed in the first appeal. Exceptions are limited to three "exceptional circumstances": (1) when substantially different evidence is raised at a subsequent trial, (2) when the law changes after the first appeal, for example by a decision of a higher court, or (3) when a decision is clearly erroneous and would result in a manifest injustice. This principle is called "law of the case".

Splits, tensions
On many questions, reasonable people may differ.  When two of those people are judges, the tension among two lines of precedent may be resolved as follows.

Jurisdictional splits: disagreements among different geographical regions or levels of federalism
If the two courts are in separate, parallel jurisdictions, there is no conflict, and two lines of precedent may persist.  Courts in one jurisdiction are influenced by decisions in others, and notably better rules may be adopted over time.

Splits among different areas of law
Courts try to formulate the common law as a "seamless web" so that principles in one area of the law apply to other areas.  However, this principle does not apply uniformly.  Thus, a word may have different definitions in different areas of the law, or different rules may apply so that a question has different answers in different legal contexts.  Judges try to minimize these conflicts, but they arise from time to time, and under principles of 'stare decisis', may persist for some time.

Conflicts

Matter of first impression
A matter of first impression (also known as an "issue of first impression", "case of first impression", or, in Latin, as primae impressionis) is an issue where the parties disagree on what the applicable law is, and there is no prior binding authority, so that the matter has to be decided for the first time.  A first impression case may be a first impression in only a particular jurisdiction.

By definition, a case of first impression cannot be decided by precedent.  Since there is no precedent for the court to follow, the court uses the plain language and legislative history of any statute that must be interpreted, holdings of other jurisdictions, persuasive authority and analogies from prior rulings by other courts (which may be higher, peers, or lower courts in the hierarchy, or from other jurisdictions), commentaries and articles by legal scholars, and the court's own logic and sense of justice.

Contrasting role of case law in common law, civil law, and mixed systems  

The different roles of case law in civil law and common law traditions create differences in the way that courts render decisions. Common law courts generally explain in detail the legal rationale behind their decisions, with citations of both legislation and previous relevant judgments, and often an exegesis of the wider legal principles. These are called ratio decidendi and constitute a precedent binding on other courts; further analyses not strictly necessary to the determination of the current case are called obiter dicta, which have persuasive authority but are not technically binding. By contrast, decisions in civil law jurisdictions are generally very short, referring only to statutes, not very analytical, and fact-based. The reason for this difference is that these civil law jurisdictions apply legislative positivism – a form of legal positivism – which holds that legislation is the only valid source of law because it has been voted on democratically; thus, it is not the judiciary's role to create law, but rather to interpret and apply statute, and therefore their decisions must reflect that.

Civil law systems

Stare decisis is not usually a doctrine used in civil law systems, because it violates the legislative positivist principle that only the legislature may make law. Instead, the civil law system relies on the doctrine of jurisprudence constante, according to which if a court has adjudicated a consistent line of cases that arrive at the same holdings using sound reasoning, then the previous decisions are highly persuasive but not controlling on issues of law. This doctrine is similar to stare decisis insofar as it dictates that a court's decision must condone a cohesive and predictable result. In theory, lower courts are generally not bound by the precedents of higher courts. In practice, the need for predictability means that lower courts generally defer to the precedent of higher courts. As a result, the precedent of courts of last resort, such as the French Cassation Court and the Council of State, is recognized as being de facto binding on lower courts.

The doctrine of jurisprudence constante also influences how court decisions are structured. In general, court decisions of common law jurisdictions give a sufficient ratio decidendi as to guide future courts. The ratio is used to justify a court decision on the basis of previous case law as well as to make it easier to use the decision as a precedent for future cases. By contrast, court decisions in some civil law jurisdictions (most prominently France) tend to be extremely brief, mentioning only the relevant legislation and codal provisions and not going into the ratio decidendi in any great detail. This is the result of the legislative positivist view that the court is only interpreting the legislature's intent and therefore detailed exposition is unnecessary. Because of this, ratio decidendi is carried out by legal academics (doctrinal writers) who provide the explanations that in common law jurisdictions would be provided by the judges themselves.

In other civil law jurisdictions, such as the German-speaking countries, ratio decidendi tend to be much more developed than in France, and courts will frequently cite previous cases and doctrinal writers. However, some courts (such as German courts) have less emphasis on the particular facts of the case than common law courts, but have more emphasis on the discussion of various doctrinal arguments and on finding what the correct interpretation of the law is.

The mixed systems of the Nordic countries are sometimes considered a branch of the civil law, but they are sometimes counted as separate from the civil law tradition. In Sweden, for instance, case law arguably plays a more important role than in some of the continental civil law systems. The two highest courts, the Supreme Court (Högsta domstolen) and the Supreme Administrative Court (Högsta förvaltningsdomstolen), have the right to set precedent which has persuasive authority on all future application of the law. Appellate courts, be they judicial (hovrätter) or administrative (kammarrätter), may also issue decisions that act as guides for the application of the law, but these decisions are persuasive, not controlling, and may therefore be overturned by higher courts.

Mixed or bijuridical systems

Some mixed systems, such as Scots law in Scotland, South-African law, Laws of the Philippines, and the law of Quebec and Louisiana, do not fit into the civil vs. common law dichotomy because they mix portions of both. Such systems may have been heavily influenced by the common law tradition; however, their private law is firmly rooted in the civil law tradition. Because of their position between the two main systems of law, these types of legal systems are sometimes referred to as "mixed" systems of law. Louisiana courts, for instance, operate under both stare decisis and jurisprudence constante. In South Africa, the precedent of higher courts is absolutely or fully binding on lower courts, whereas the precedent of lower courts only has persuasive authority on higher courts; horizontally, precedent is prima facie or presumptively binding between courts.

Role of academics in civil law jurisdictions

Law professors in common law traditions play a much smaller role in developing case law than professors in civil law traditions. Because court decisions in civil law traditions are brief and not amenable to establishing precedent, much of the exposition of the law in civil law traditions is done by academics rather than by judges; this is called doctrine and may be published in treatises or in journals such as Recueil Dalloz in France. Historically, common law courts relied little on legal scholarship; thus, at the turn of the twentieth century, it was very rare to see an academic writer quoted in a legal decision (except perhaps for the academic writings of prominent judges such as Coke and Blackstone). Today academic writers are often cited in legal argument and decisions as persuasive authority; often, they are cited when judges are attempting to implement reasoning that other courts have not yet adopted, or when the judge believes the academic's restatement of the law is more compelling than can be found in precedent. Thus common law systems are adopting one of the approaches long common in civil law jurisdictions.

Critical analysis

Court formulations

Justice Louis Brandeis, in a heavily footnoted dissent to Burnet v. Coronado Oil & Gas Co., 405–411 (1932), explained (citations and quotations omitted):

In his "landmark dissent" in Burnet, Brandeis "catalogued the Court's actual overruling practices in such a powerful manner that his attendant stare decisis analysis immediately assumed canonical authority."

The United States Court of Appeals for the Third Circuit has stated:

The United States Court of Appeals for the Ninth Circuit has stated:

Lord Hodge of the UK Supreme Court quoted Lord Wright in 1938 saying:

Academic study
Precedent viewed against passing time can serve to establish trends, thus indicating the next logical step in evolving interpretations of the law. For instance, if immigration has become more and more restricted under the law, then the next legal decision on that subject may serve to restrict it further still.  The existence of submerged precedent (reasoned opinions not made available through conventional legal research sources) has been identified as a potentially distorting force in the evolution of law.

Scholars have recently attempted to apply network theory to precedent in order to establish which precedent is most important or authoritative, and how the court's interpretations and priorities have changed over time.

Application

Development
Early English common law did not have or require the stare decisis doctrine for a range of legal and technological reasons:
During the formative period of the common law, the royal courts constituted only one among many fora in which in the English could settle their disputes. The royal courts operated alongside and in competition with ecclesiastic, manorial, urban, mercantile, and local courts.
Royal courts were not organised into a hierarchy; instead, different royal courts (exchequer, common pleas, king's bench, and chancery) were in competition with each other.
Substantial law on almost all matters was neither legislated nor codified, eliminating the need for courts to interpret legislation.
Common law's main distinctive features and focus were not substantial law, which was customary law, but procedural.
The practice of citing previous cases was not to find binding legal rules but as evidence of custom.
Customary law was not a rational and consistent body of rules and did not require a system of binding precedent.
Before the printing press, the state of the written records of cases rendered the stare decisis doctrine utterly impracticable.

These features changed over time, opening the door to the doctrine of stare decisis:

United States legal system

Over time courts in the United States and especially its Supreme Court developed a large body of judicial decisions which are called "precedents". These "[r]ules and principles established in prior cases inform the Court's future decisions." The adherence to rules and principles created in past cases as a foundation for future decisions by the courts is called stare decisis. The United States Supreme Court considers stare decisis not only as an important doctrine, but also "the means by which we ensure that the law will not merely change erratically, but will develop in a principled and intelligible fashion." Stare decisis aims to bolster the legitimacy of the judicial process and foster the rule of law. It does so by strengthening stability, certainty, predictability, consistency and uniformity in the application of the law to cases and litigants. By adhering to stare decisis the Supreme Court attempts to preserve its role "as a careful, unbiased, and predictable decisionmaker that decides cases according to the law rather than the Justices' individual policy preferences." In Vasquez v. Hillery (1986) the Supreme Court stated succinctly that stare decisis "contributes to the integrity of our constitutional system of government, both in appearance and in fact" by maintaining the notion "that bedrock principles are founded in the law, rather than in the proclivities of individuals."

Stare decisis reduces the number and scope of legal questions that the court must resolve in litigation. It is therefore a time saver for judges and litigants. Once a court has settled a particular question of law it has established a precedent. Thanks to stare decisis lawsuits can be quickly and efficiently dismissed because legal battles can be resolved through recourse to rules and principles established prior decisions. Stare decisis can thus encourage parties to settle cases out of court and thereby enhance judicial efficiency.

Several Supreme Court decisions were overruled by subsequent decisions since 1798. In doing so the Supreme Court has time and time again made several statements regarding stare decisis. The following is a non-exhaustive list of examples of these statements:

 Citizens United v. FEC, 558 U.S. 310, at 378 (2010) (Roberts, J., concurring): [Stare decisis'] greatest purpose is to serve a constitutional ideal—the rule of law. It follows that in the unusual circumstance when fidelity to any particular precedent does more damage to this constitutional ideal than to advance it, we must be more willing to depart from that precedent." (citations omitted)
 Planned Parenthood of Se. Pa. v. Casey, 505 U.S. 833, at 854 (1992) "[T]he very concept of the rule of law underlying our own Constitution requires such continuity over time that a respect for precedent is, by definition, indispensable.") (citations omitted)
 Alleyne v. United States, 570 U.S. 99, 118 (2013) (Sotomayor, J., concurring): "We generally adhere to our prior decisions, even if we questions their soundness, because doing so 'promotes the evenhanded, predictable, and consistent development of legal principles, fosters reliance on judicial decisions, and contributes to the actual and perceived integrity of the judicial process.'")
 Hilton v. South Carolina Public. Railway Commission, 502 U.S. 197, at 202 (1991): "Adherence to precedent promotes stability, predictability, and respect for judicial authority."
 Payne v. Tennessee, 501 U.S. 808, at 827 (1991): "Stare decisis is the preferred course because it promotes the evenhanded, predictable, and consistent development of legal principles, fosters reliance on judicial decisions, and contributes to the actual and perceived integrity of the judicial process."
 Vasquez v. Hillery, 474 U.S. 254, at 265-66 (1986): "[T]he important doctrine of stare decisis [is] the means by which we ensure that the law will not merely change erratically, but will develop in a principled and intelligible fashion. That doctrine permits society to presume that bedrock principles are founded in the law, rather than in the proclivities of individuals, and thereby contributes to the integrity of our constitutional system of government, both in appearance and in fact."
 Taylor v. Sturgell, 553 U.S. 880, at 903 (2008): "[S]tare decisis will allow courts swiftly to dispose of repetitive suits ...")
 Payne v. Tennessee, 501 U.S. 808, at 834 (1991) (Scalia, J., concurring): "What would enshrine power as the governing principle of this Court is the notion that an important constitutional decision with plainly inadequate rational support must be left in place for the sole reason that it once attracted a [majority of the Court]."
 Patterson v. McLean Credit Union, 491 U.S. 164, at 172 (1989): "Our precedents are not sacrosanct, for we have overruled prior decisions where the necessity and propriety of doing so has been established."
 Smith v. Allwright, 321 U.S. 649, at 665 (1944): "[W]hen convinced of former error, this Court has never felt constrained to follow precedents. In constitutional questions, where correction depends upon amendment and not upon legislative action this Court throughout its history has freely exercised its power to reexamine the basis of its constitutional decisions."
 Janus v. Am. Fed. of State, County, & Mun. Employees, 585 U.S. ___, No. 16-1466, slip op. at 34 (2018): "We will not overturn a past decision unless there are strong grounds for doing so."
 Planned Parenthood of Se. Pa. v. Casey, 505 U.S. 833, at 864 (1992) (plurality opinion): "[A] decision to overrule should rest on some special reason over and above the belief that a prior case was wrongly decided. The plurality opinion in Casey stated also that reexamining precedent requires more than "a present doctrinal disposition to come out differently".
  Arizona v. Rumsey, 467 U.S. 203, at 212 (1984): "Although adherence to precedent is not rigidly required in constitutional cases, any departure from the doctrine of stare decisis demands special justification."

Stare decisis applies to the holding of a case, rather than to obiter dicta ("things said by the way"). As the United States Supreme Court has put it: "dicta may be followed if sufficiently persuasive but are not binding".

In the U.S. Supreme Court, the principle of stare decisis is most flexible in constitutional cases, as observed by Justice Brandeis in his landmark dissent in Burnet (as quoted at length above).  For example, in the years 1946–1992, the U.S. Supreme Court reversed itself in about 130 cases. The U.S. Supreme Court has further explained as follows:

The Court has stated that where a court gives multiple reasons for a given result, each alternative reason that is "explicitly" labeled by the court as an "independent" ground for the decision is not treated as "simply a dictum".

As Colin Starger has pointed out, the contemporary rule of stare decisis descended from Brandeis's landmark dissent in Burnet would later split into strong and weak conceptions as a result of the disagreement between Chief Justice William Rehnquist and Associate Justice Thurgood Marshall in Payne v. Tennessee (1991).  The strong conception requires a "special justification" to overrule challenged precedent beyond the fact the precedent was "wrongly decided", while the weak conception holds that a precedent can be overruled if it suffers from "bad reasoning".

The opinion of Chief Justice John Roberts in the case June Medical Services, LLC v. Russo provides a clear statement of the strong conception of stare decisis. In this case, the Court upheld, by a 5-4 margin, their 2016 decision in Whole Woman's Health v. Hellerstedt  that struck down a similar Texas law requiring doctors who perform abortions to have the right to admit patients at a nearby hospital. Roberts wrote, “The legal doctrine of stare decisis requires us, absent special circumstances, to treat like cases alike." Roberts provided the fifth vote to uphold the 2016 decision, even though he felt it was wrongly decided.

English legal system
The doctrine of binding precedent or stare decisis is basic to the English legal system. Special features of the English legal system include the following:

The Supreme Court's ability to override its own precedent 
The British House of Lords, as the court of last appeal outside Scotland before it was replaced by the UK Supreme Court, was not strictly bound to always follow its own decisions until the case London Street Tramways v London County Council [1898] AC 375. After this case, once the Lords had given a ruling on a point of law, the matter was closed unless and until Parliament made a change by statute. This is the most strict form of the doctrine of stare decisis (one not applied, previously, in common law jurisdictions, where there was somewhat greater flexibility for a court of last resort to review its own precedent).

This situation changed, however, after the issuance of the Practice Statement of 1966. It enabled the House of Lords to adapt English law to meet changing social conditions. In R v G & R 2003, the House of Lords overruled its decision in Caldwell 1981, which had allowed the Lords to establish mens rea ("guilty mind") by measuring a defendant's conduct against that of a "reasonable person", regardless of the defendant's actual state of mind.

However, the Practice Statement was seldom applied by the House of Lords, usually only as a last resort. Up to 2005, the House of Lords rejected its past decisions no more than 20 times. They were reluctant to use it because they feared to introduce uncertainty into the law. In particular, the Practice Statement stated that the Lords would be especially reluctant to overrule themselves in criminal cases because of the importance of certainty of that law. The first case involving criminal law to be overruled with the Practice Statement was Anderton v Ryan (1985), which was overruled by R v Shivpuri (1986), two decades after the Practice Statement. Remarkably, the precedent overruled had been made only a year before, but it had been criticised by several academic lawyers. As a result, Lord Bridge stated he was "undeterred by the consideration that the decision in Anderton v Ryan was so recent. The Practice Statement is an effective abandonment of our pretension to infallibility. If a serious error embodied in a decision of this House has distorted the law, the sooner it is corrected the better." Still, the House of Lords has remained reluctant to overrule itself in some cases; in R v Kansal (2002), the majority of House members adopted the opinion that R v Lambert had been wrongly decided and agreed to depart from their earlier decision.

Distinguishing precedent on legal (rather than fact) grounds
A precedent does not bind a court if it finds there was a lack of care in the original "Per Incuriam". For example, if a statutory provision or precedent had not been brought to the previous court's attention before its decision, the precedent would not be binding.

Rules of statutory interpretation

One of the most important roles of precedent is to resolve ambiguities in other legal texts, such as constitutions, statutes, and regulations.  The process involves, first and foremost, consultation of the plain language of the text, as enlightened by the legislative history of enactment, subsequent precedent, and experience with various interpretations of similar texts.

Statutory interpretation in the UK
A judge's normal aids include access to all previous cases in which a precedent has been set, and a good English dictionary.

Judges and barristers in the UK use four primary rules for interpreting the law.

Under the literal rule, the judge should do what the actual legislation states rather than trying to do what the judge thinks that it means. The judge should use the plain everyday ordinary meaning of the words, even if this produces an unjust or undesirable outcome. A good example of problems with this method is R v Maginnis (1987), in which several judges in separate opinions found several different dictionary meanings of the word supply. Another example is Fisher v Bell, where it was held that a shopkeeper who placed an illegal item in a shop window with a price tag did not make an offer to sell it, because of the specific meaning of "offer for sale" in contract law, merely an invitation to treat. As a result of this case, Parliament amended the statute concerned to end this discrepancy.

The golden rule is used when use of the literal rule would obviously create an absurd result. There are two ways in which the golden rule can be applied: a narrow method, and a broad method. Under the narrow method, when there are apparently two contradictory meanings to the wording of a legislative provision, or the wording is ambiguous, the least absurd is to be preferred. Under the broad method, the court modifies the literal meaning in such a way as to avoid the absurd result. An example of the latter approach is Adler v George (1964). Under the Official Secrets Act 1920 it was an offence to obstruct HM Forces "in the vicinity of" a prohibited place. Adler argued that he was not in the vicinity of such a place but was actually in it. The court chose not to read the statutory wording in a literal sense to avoid what would otherwise be an absurd result, and Adler was convicted.

The mischief rule is the most flexible of the interpretation methods. Stemming from Heydon's Case (1584), it allows the court to enforce what the statute is intended to remedy rather than what the words actually say. For example, in Corkery v Carpenter (1950), a man was found guilty of being drunk in charge of a carriage, although in fact he only had a bicycle. The final rule; although will no longer be used after the UK fully transitions out of the European Union. Known as the Purposive approach- this considers the intention of the European Court of Justice when the act was passed.

Statutory interpretation in the United States
In the United States, the courts have stated consistently that the text of the statute is read as it is written, using the ordinary meaning of the words of the statute.
"[I]n interpreting a statute a court should always turn to one cardinal canon before all others. ... [C]ourts must presume that a legislature says in a statute what it means and means in a statute what it says there." Connecticut Nat'l Bank v. Germain, 112 S. Ct. 1146, 1149 (1992). Indeed, "[w]hen the words of a statute are unambiguous, then, this first canon is also the last: 'judicial inquiry is complete.' "
"A fundamental rule of statutory construction requires that every part of a statute be presumed to have some effect, and not be treated as meaningless unless absolutely necessary." Raven Coal Corp. v. Absher, 153 Va. 332, 149 S.E. 541 (1929).
"In assessing statutory language, unless words have acquired a peculiar meaning, by virtue of statutory definition or judicial construction, they are to be construed in accordance with their common usage." Muller v. BP Exploration (Alaska) Inc., 923 P.2d 783, 787–88 (Alaska 1996).

However, most legal texts have some lingering ambiguity—inevitably, situations arise in which the words chosen by the legislature do not address the precise facts in issue, or there is some tension among two or more statutes.  In such cases, a court must analyze the various available sources, and reach a resolution of the ambiguity.  The "Canons of statutory construction" are discussed in a separate article.  Once the ambiguity is resolved, that resolution has binding effect as described in the rest of this article.

Practical application
Although inferior courts are bound in theory by superior court precedent, in practice a judge may believe that justice requires an outcome at some variance with precedent, and may distinguish the facts of the individual case on reasoning that does not appear in the binding precedent.  On appeal, the appellate court may either adopt the new reasoning, or reverse on the basis of precedent.  On the other hand, if the losing party does not appeal (typically because of the cost of the appeal), the lower court decision may remain in effect, at least as to the individual parties.

Judicial resistance
Occasionally, lower court judges may explicitly state a personal disagreement with the rendered judgment, but are required to rule a particular way because of binding precedent. Note that inferior courts cannot evade binding precedent of superior courts, but a court can depart from its own prior decisions.

Structural considerations
In the United States, stare decisis can interact in counterintuitive ways with the federal and state court systems. On an issue of federal law, a state court is not bound by an interpretation of federal law at the district or circuit level, but is bound by an interpretation by the United States Supreme Court. On an interpretation of state law, whether common law or statutory law, the federal courts are bound by the interpretation of a state court of last resort, and are required normally to defer to the precedent of intermediate state courts as well.

Courts may choose to obey precedent of international jurisdictions, but this is not an application of the doctrine of stare decisis, because foreign decisions are not binding. Rather, a foreign decision that is obeyed on the basis of the soundness of its reasoning will be called persuasive authority—indicating that its effect is limited to the persuasiveness of the reasons it provides.

Originalism
Originalism is an approach to interpretation of a legal text in which controlling weight is given to the intent of the original authors (at least the intent as inferred by a modern judge).  In contrast, a non-originalist looks at other cues to meaning, including the current meaning of the words, the pattern and trend of other judicial decisions, changing context and improved scientific understanding, observation of practical outcomes and "what works", contemporary standards of justice, and stare decisis. Both are directed at interpreting the text, not changing it—interpretation is the process of resolving ambiguity and choosing from among possible meanings, not changing the text.

The two approaches look at different sets of underlying facts that may or may not point in the same direction—stare decisis gives most weight to the newest understanding of a legal text, while originalism gives most weight to the oldest.  While they do not necessarily reach different results in every case, the two approaches are in direct tension. Originalists such as Justice Antonin Scalia argue that "Stare decisis is not usually a doctrine used in civil law systems, because it violates the principle that only the legislature may make law."  Justice Scalia argues that America is a civil law nation, not a common law nation. By principle, originalists are generally unwilling to defer to precedent when precedent seems to come into conflict with the originalist's own interpretation of the Constitutional text or inferences of original intent (even in situations where there is no original source statement of that original intent). However, there is still room within an originalist paradigm for stare decisis; whenever the plain meaning of the text has alternative constructions, past precedent is generally considered a valid guide, with the qualifier being that it cannot change what the text actually says.

Originalists vary in the degree to which they defer to precedent. In his confirmation hearings, Justice Clarence Thomas answered a question from Senator Strom Thurmond, qualifying his willingness to change precedent in this way:

Possibly he has changed his mind, or there are a very large body of cases which merit "the additional step" of ignoring the doctrine; according to Scalia, "Clarence Thomas doesn't believe in stare decisis, period. If a constitutional line of authority is wrong, he would say, let's get it right."

Caleb Nelson, a former clerk for Justice Thomas and law professor at the University of Virginia, has elaborated on the role of stare decisis in originalist jurisprudence:

Advantages and disadvantages

There are disadvantages and advantages of binding precedent, as noted by scholars and jurists.

Criticism of precedent

One of the most prominent critics of the development of legal precedent on a case-by-case basis as both overly reactive and unfairly retroactive was philosopher Jeremy Bentham.  He famously attacked the common law as "dog law":

In a 1997 book, attorney Michael Trotter blamed overreliance by American lawyers on precedent — especially persuasive authority of marginal relevance — rather than the merits of the case at hand, as a major factor behind the escalation of legal costs during the 20th century. He argued that courts should ban the citation of persuasive authority from outside their jurisdiction and force lawyers and parties to argue only from binding precedent, subject to two exceptions:

 cases where the foreign jurisdiction's law is the subject of the case, or
 instances where a litigant intends to ask the highest court of the jurisdiction to overturn binding precedent, and therefore needs to cite persuasive precedent to demonstrate a countervailing trend in other jurisdictions.

The disadvantages of stare decisis include its rigidity, the complexity of learning law, the fact that differences between certain cases may be very small and thereby appear illogical and arbitrary, and the slow growth or incremental changes to the law that are in need of major overhaul.

An argument often leveled against precedent is that it is undemocratic because it allows judges, who may or may not be elected, to make law.

Agreement with precedent

A counter-argument (in favor of the advantages of stare decisis) is that if the legislature wishes to alter the case law (other than constitutional interpretations) by statute, the legislature is empowered to do so. Critics sometimes accuse particular judges of applying the doctrine selectively, invoking it to support precedent that the judge supported anyway, but ignoring it in order to change precedent with which the judge disagreed

There is much discussion about the virtue of using stare decisis. Supporters of the system, such as minimalists, argue that obeying precedent makes decisions "predictable". For example, a business person can be reasonably assured of predicting a decision where the facts of his or her case are sufficiently similar to a case decided previously. This parallels the arguments against retroactive (ex post facto) laws banned by the U.S. Constitution .

See also

Case citation
Case of first impression
Commanding precedent
Custom (law)
Distinguish
First impression
Law of Citations (Roman concept)
Legal opinion
Memorandum opinion
Persuasive precedent
Precedent book
Question of fact
Qiyas
Ratio decidendi
Taqlid

Notes

External links 

 
 

Latin legal terminology
Legal citation
Legal doctrines and principles
Legal reasoning
Persuasion techniques
Sources of law
Judicial legal terminology

ja:判例